Coast Survey may refer to:

Office of Coast Survey, an element of the National Oceanic and Atmospheric Administration established in 1970
United States Coast and Geodetic Survey, a U.S. Government scientific agency of 1807–1970, known as the Survey of the Coast from 1807 to 1836 and as the United States Coast Survey from 1836 to 1878
National Ocean Service, an office of the National Oceanic and Atmospheric Administration established in 1970 and known as the National Ocean Survey until 1983

See also
Hydrographic survey
National Geodetic Survey
United States Geological Survey